Andrew Nicholas Buckle (born 24 September 1982) is an Australian professional golfer.

Buckle was born in Brisbane, Queensland. He had a promising amateur career, including two wins in the Boy's 15–17 division at the World Junior Golf Championships and the Australian Amateur.

Buckle won the 2002 Queensland Open on his professional debut. As a professional, he has plied his trade all over the world, including time on the PGA Tour of Australasia and appearances in Europe and Japan. He joined the Asian Tour in 2005 and in 2006 he finished second in the Indonesia Open and the TCL Classic, which are both Asian Tour/European Tour co-sanctioned events. Also in 2006, he won his second professional event at Virginia Beach Open on the U.S.-based Nationwide Tour.

Buckle has performed consistently around the world and for a time in 2006 he was the only golfer in the top 100 of the Official World Golf Ranking who was not a member of one of the three richest under-50 men's tours (the PGA, European and Japanese tours), but he won a PGA Tour card at the 2006 Qualifying School. He played on the PGA Tour in 2007 and 2008 but had to return to the Nationwide Tour in 2009.

Amateur wins
1999 World Junior Golf Championships – Boys' 15–17 division
2000 World Junior Golf Championships – Boys' 15–17 division
2001 Australian Amateur
2002 Queensland Amateur (Australia), Saujana Amateur Open (Malaysia), Dogwood Invitational (United States)

Professional wins (2)

PGA Tour of Australasia wins (1)

Nationwide Tour wins (1)

Results in major championships

Buckle never played in the Masters Tournament.

CUT = missed the half-way cut
"T" = tied

Team appearances
Amateur
Nomura Cup (representing Australia): 2001 (winners)
Eisenhower Trophy (representing Australia): 2002
Australian Men's Interstate Teams Matches (representing Queensland): 2001 (winners), 2002

See also
2006 Nationwide Tour graduates

References

External links

Australian male golfers
PGA Tour of Australasia golfers
Asian Tour golfers
PGA Tour golfers
Korn Ferry Tour graduates
1982 births
Living people